Aliabad-e Bala may refer to various places in Iran:
Aliabad-e Bala, East Azerbaijan
Aliabad-e Bala, Fars
Aliabad-e Bala, Gilan
Aliabad-e Bala, Kerman
Aliabad-e Bala, Rafsanjan, Kerman Province
Aliabad-e Bala, Zarand, Kerman Province
Aliabad-e Bala, Kermanshah
Aliabad-e Bala, Razavi Khorasan
Aliabad-e Bala, Mahvelat, Razavi Khorasan Province
Aliabad-e Bala, South Khorasan

See also
Aliabad-e Olya (disambiguation)